68 High Street, formerly the Children's Hospital, is a historic colonial revival building in Portland, Maine. Located on the eastern edge of Portland's West End, the building was built in 1909 and was designed by architect Frederick A. Tompson. According to news archives, Drs. Edville Gerhardt Abbott and Harold A. Pingree and Frank W. Lamb founded this worldwide famous children's hospital for crippled children with scoliosis together in 1908.
 It closed in 1948, with most of the 56 patients at the time being transferred to Maine General Hospital, which was later renamed the Maine Medical Center. It also served as an annex to the Mussey Mansion until the left part of that building was demolished in 1961. It was also owned by the University of Maine system. It housed the University of Maine School of Law from 1962? until 1972, after which was used by the University of Southern Maine as administrative offices. 

In 2010, Community Housing of Maine sought to develop the property and the adjacent empty lot into 35 units of affordable housing. It was listed on the National Register of Historic Places .

The Portland Children's Hospital is known for both, its engineering and its commitment to the wellbeing of children. Edville G. Abbott, M.D., as Surgeon in Chief of the Children's Hospital, fostered the "Abbott Treatment" for adjusting bend of the spine in children experiencing scoliosis in 1911. The Abbott Treatment was viewed as the norm of care for quite some time and keeps on being referred to in clinical diaries.

Elm Terrace
In 2011, the Maine State Housing Authority approved the building and the adjacent empty lot, 68 High Street, for 38 low income housing units. The building is set to be renovated to fulfill the Americans with Disabilities Act requirements, including the addition of elevators. The first floor of 66 High Street will include parking units. The plan to redevelop the property became controversial after state treasurer Bruce Poliquin criticized the housing authority for their per-unit cost.

See also
National Register of Historic Places listings in Portland, Maine

References

Hospital buildings completed in 1909
Apartment buildings in Portland, Maine
Colonial Revival architecture in Maine
Hospitals in Portland, Maine
Buildings at the University of Southern Maine
West End (Portland, Maine)
Hospital buildings on the National Register of Historic Places in Maine
National Register of Historic Places in Portland, Maine